This is a list of clam dishes and foods, which are prepared using clams as a primary ingredient. Edible clams can be eaten raw or cooked.  Preparations methods include steamed, boiled, baked or fried.

Clam dishes

 Clams casino – a clam "on the halfshell" dish with breadcrumbs and bacon. It originated in Rhode Island in the United States and is often served as an appetizer in New England and is served in variations nationally.
 Clam cake – also known as clam fritters
 Clam dip – a dipping sauce and condiment
 Clam liquor – a liquid extracted during cooking and opening of clams. Undiluted it is called clam broth.
 
 White clam pie – a pizza variety
 Clam soup –  a soup prepared using clams as a main ingredient
 Clam chowder – a well-known chowder soup
 Jaecheop-guk – a clear Korean soup made with small freshwater clams
 Fabes con almejas – a clam and bean stew that originated in the principality of Asturias in the 19th century as peasant fare. It is a lighter variation of Asturian fabada whose primary ingredients are sausage, beans and pork.
 
 New England clam bake – also simply called a "clam bake"
 Clams oreganata – an Italian American seafood dish served most commonly as an appetizer
 Clam sauce – used as a topping for pasta

Beverages

 Caesar – a cocktail created and primarily consumed in Canada.  It typically contains vodka, a caesar mix (a blend of tomato juice and clam broth), hot sauce, and Worcestershire sauce, and is served with ice in a large, celery salt-rimmed glass, typically garnished with a stalk of celery and wedge of lime.
 Clamato –  a commercial drink made of reconstituted tomato juice concentrate, flavored with spices and clam broth

See also
 List of seafood dishes

References

External links
 
 Clam Recipes. All Recipes.

 
Clam
Clam dishes